Marlborough is a town in Hartford County, Connecticut, United States.  It contains the census-designated place (CDP) of Terramuggus.  The town's population was 6,133 at the 2020 census. Marlborough is a suburban and rural community. The local high school is RHAM High School. In 2013, Marlborough ranked third (of 24) in Connecticut Magazine's biannual ranking of Connecticut small towns. Educationally, RHAM High School, which serves Marlborough, Hebron, and Andover students, is one of the top-ranked regional high schools in the state on the SAT in 2017, and 11th highest-performing school in the state on the test. The town is home to Elmer Theines-Mary Hall elementary school which serves Pre-K through 6th grade. The school scores above state average on standardized testing and student progress.

History

The earliest inhabitants of present-day Marlborough, prior to the arrival of the English settlers, were the Podunk people, an indigenous people who spoke an Algonquian language. The beginnings of the town can be traced back to the opening of (John) Sadler's Ordinary, a colonial-era rest stop, in 1648. It was the second such establishment in Connecticut Colony after Hartford. It was a crossroads of sorts during colonial times, and travelers would stop to rest at the heart of what is now Marlborough center at the Buell House (now the Marlborough Tavern). Although the original Sadler's Ordinary (Inn) eventually went out of business, a new Sadler's Ordinary was built in a new location in 1970, and is still in business today.

In 1747, William Buell and Joel Foote petitioned the colonial General Court for permission to form an Ecclesiastical Society and settle what was to become known as the town of Marlborough. In 1749, they began constructing the First Congregational Church which wouldn’t be finished until 1803. Marlborough was incorporated on 13 October 1803 with land from parts of three neighboring towns: Glastonbury, Colchester (New London County) and Hebron (Tolland County). The town took its name from Marlborough, Massachusetts, which in turn took its name from Marlborough, Wiltshire in England. 

By 1907 the town had a population of less than 305 residents. It wasn’t until the 1960s that the town was rediscovered as a bedroom community for 
white-collar professionals working in Hartford. A complete town history called Reflections Into Marlborough's History was published in 2007.

Geography

Marlborough is adjacent to four other Connecticut towns (Glastonbury to the north, East Hampton to the west, Colchester to the south, and Hebron to the east). East Hampton, Colchester and Hebron are each in different counties from each other and from Marlborough.

Route 2, a two-lane highway (sometimes three) in most sections, bisects the town, and there are three Marlborough exits, at South Main Street, Route 66, and West Road, although there are exits westbound only for South Main and eastbound only for West Road. It takes approximately 15– 20 minutes to get to Hartford, 40 minutes to New London, 45 minutes to New Haven, and 40 minutes to Springfield, MA.  Marlborough is generally equidistant between Boston and New York. Boston is an hour and 45 minutes away, while New York City is a two-hour car ride, pending traffic conditions. Popular vacation areas are also reasonable drives from Marlborough. The Berkshire Mountains are an hour and 20 minutes away, and popular Rhode Island beaches, depending on which one you go to, are an hour (Misquamicut, Westerly) to an hour and 20 minutes away (Narragansett).

Demographics

As of the census of 2010, there were 6,404 people, 2,292 households, and 1,820 families residing in the town. The racial makeup of the town was 65.3% White, 1.3% African American, 30.1% Native American, 1.6% Asian, 0.2% from other races, and 1.4% from two or more races. Hispanic or Latino of any race were 2.8% of the population.

There were 2,292 households, out of which 36.9% had children under the age of 18 living with them, 68.9% were married couples living together, 7.5% had a female householder with no husband present, and 20.6% were non-families. 15.8% of all households were made up of individuals, and 5.8% had someone living alone who was 65 years of age or older.  The average household size was 2.75 and the average family size was 3.09.

In the town, the population was spread out, with 27.4% under the age of 18, 3.4% from 20 to 24, 22.7% from 25 to 44, 34.1% from 45 to 64, and 12.5% who were 65 years of age or older.  The median age was 43 years.

The median income for a household in the town was $139,255 and the median income for a family was $159,376. Males had a median income of $98,789 versus $64,959 for females. The per capita income for the town was $58,805. About 0.3% of families and 1.0% of the population were below the poverty line, including none of those under age 18 and 0.5% of those age 65 or over.

Government and politics

Notable people

 Larry Boardman (born 1936), boxer born in Marlborough
 Chris Cillizza (born 1976), journalist born in Marlborough
 Mary Hall (1843–1927), suffragist, first female lawyer in Connecticut, born in Marlborough
 A.J. Pollock (born 1987), Major League Baseball player with the Arizona Diamondbacks; born in Marlborough, attended RHAM High School in Hebron, CT
 William Henry Richmond (1821–1922), anthracite coal mine operator born in Marlborough
 Gretchen Ulion (born 1972), 1998 Winter Olympics ice hockey gold medalist

Points of interest

 Marlborough Congregational Church, placed on the National Register of Historic Places in 1993
 Marlborough Arts Center – A non-profit regional arts center housed in the restored Charles W. Hall building 
 Marlborough Tavern

References

Further reading

 Mary Hall, Report of the Celebration of the Centennial of the Incorporation of the Town of Marlborough: August 23d and 25th, 1903. Hartford: Case, Lockwood & Brainard Company, 1904.

 Romano Ghirlanda, Reflections into Marlborough's History. Hartford, 2007.

External links

Marlborough Historical Society

 
Towns in Hartford County, Connecticut
Towns in Connecticut
Greater Hartford